Cheram is a city and the capital of Charam County, Kohgiluyeh and Boyer-Ahmad Province, Iran. In 2017, its population was 17,213.

References

Populated places in Charam County
Cities in Kohgiluyeh and Boyer-Ahmad Province